The knockout stage of the 2016 OFC Nations Cup began on 8 June with the semi-finals and end on 11 June 2016 with the final at Sir John Guise Stadium in Port Moresby.

All match times are local, UTC+10.

Format
In the knockout stage, if a match was level at the end of normal playing time, extra time was played (two periods of 15 minutes each). If still tied after extra time, the match was decided by a penalty shoot-out to determine the winners.

The OFC set out the following matchups for the semi-finals:
 Match 1: Winner Group B vs Runner-up Group A
 Match 2: Winner Group A vs Runner-up Group B

Qualified teams
The top two placed teams from each of the two groups qualified for the knockout stage.

Bracket

Semi-finals

New Zealand vs New Caledonia

Papua New Guinea vs Solomon Islands

Final

References

External links
 2016 OFC Nations Cup semi-finals at oceaniafootball.com
 2016 OFC Nations Cup final at oceaniafootball.com

Knockout stage
2018 FIFA World Cup qualification (OFC)
Nations Cup knockout